Richard William Kunkel (born August 7, 1934), is an American politician in the state of North Dakota. He was a member of the North Dakota House of Representatives from 1991 to 1998. He is an alumnus of Minot State University and the University of North Dakota, and was a former Devils Lake Superintendent of Schools.

References

1934 births
Living people
North Dakota Republicans